William C. Knights (January 24, 1917 – February 5, 1973) was an American politician from New York.

Life
He was born on January 24, 1917, in Knowlesville, Orleans County, New York. He attended Knowlesville Union School and Medina High School. Afterwards he engaged in farming and the real estate business. He was also an auctioneer, and entered politics as a Republican.

Knights was a member of the New York State Assembly (137th D.) in 1973. A few weeks into his term, he suffered injuries in a car accident, and died on February 5, 1973, in Arnold Gregory Memorial Hospital in Albion, New York.

References

1917 births
1973 deaths
People from Ridgeway, New York
Republican Party members of the New York State Assembly
Road incident deaths in New York (state)
20th-century American politicians